

Countess of Hanau (1429–1458)

Countess of Hanau-Münzenberg (1458–1736)

Countess of Hanau-Lichtenberg (1458–1736) 

Hanau